Nasser Haji Mokhtar is a retired Iranian midfielder who played for Iran national football team. He was formerly playing for Taj Tehran and Nirooye Havaei.

References

External links
 
 Nasser Haji Mokhtar at TeamMelli.com

Iranian footballers
Esteghlal F.C. players
Living people
Association football midfielders
Year of birth missing (living people)
Iran international footballers